Roy Staley (April 18, 1915 – March 25, 2001) was an American hurdler. He competed in the men's 110 metres hurdles at the 1936 Summer Olympics.

References

External links
 

1915 births
2001 deaths
Athletes (track and field) at the 1936 Summer Olympics
American male hurdlers
Olympic track and field athletes of the United States
Track and field athletes from Los Angeles
20th-century American people